CTSA may refer to :

 Canadian Traditional Scouting Association
Cathepsin A is an enzyme which is classified both as a cathepsin and a carboxypeptidase.
The Catholic Theological Society of America is a professional association of theologians that was founded in 1946 to promote studies and research in theology within the Catholic tradition. 
The Channel Tunnel Safety Authority
Claire Trevor School of the Arts
The Clinical and Translational Science Award program administered by the U.S. National Institutes of Health.